|}

The Premier Kelso Hurdle is a Grade 2 National Hunt hurdle race in Britain which is open to horses aged four years or older. It is run at Kelso over a distance of about 2 miles and 2 furlongs (2 miles, 2 furlongs and 25 yards or ), and during its running there are ten hurdles to be jumped. The race is for novice hurdlers, and it is scheduled to take place each year in late February or early March.

The race was first run in 1990 and was awarded Grade 2 status (previously Class B) in 2003.

Winners

See also
 Horse racing in Great Britain
 List of British National Hunt races

References
 Racing Post:

 pedigreequery.com – Kelso Novices' Hurdle – Kelso.

Sports competitions in Scotland
National Hunt races in Great Britain
Kelso Racecourse
National Hunt hurdle races
Recurring sporting events established in 1990
1990 establishments in Scotland